Max Neuhaus (August 9, 1939 – February 3, 2009) was an American musician, composer and artist who was a noted interpreter of contemporary and experimental percussion music in the 1960s. He went on to create numerous permanent and short-term sound installations in the four decades that followed.

Biography
Neuhaus was born on August 9, 1939 in Beaumont, Texas and attended high school in Houston. He studied percussion with Paul Price at the Manhattan School of Music, graduating with a master of music degree in 1962. He performed as a percussion soloist on concert tours throughout the United States with Pierre Boulez (1962-1963) and Karlheinz Stockhausen (1963-1964). In 1964 and 1965, he presented solo recitals in Carnegie Hall in New York City and in fiteeen major European cities. In 1966, he published on Mass Art Inc. four live realizations of John Cage's Fontana Mix (1958), an indeterminate graphic score originally intended for a tape piece, with or without additional instruments. Entitled Fontana Mix-Feed, Neuhaus' realizations employed controlled feedback generated by placing contact microphones on percussive instruments and hooking the microphones up to loudspeakers positioned directly opposite the instruments.

His work as a percussionist culminated in an album of contemporary solo percussion work, Electronics & Percussion - Five Realizations By Max Neuhaus, which he recorded for Columbia Masterworks in 1968, and was produced by David Behrman.

In 1968, he pursued a career as a contemporary artist by developing sound installations, using electronic or electroacoustic sounds which would emanate from a source within a particular space or location. He coined the term "sound installation" to describe his sound works which were neither music nor events. One piece called Times Square was built in 1977 beneath a grate on a traffic island in Manhattan where pedestrians would be "enveloped by a deeply resonant and mildly undulating drone, its tone suggestive of low-pitched chimes or church bells." Other works included penny whistles heard underwater in swimming pools, electronic sounds within an arboretum and the modified sounds of listeners whistling tunes over public radio.

Permanent sound installations by Neuhaus are found in these locations: 

The Menil Collection, Houston, USA
Synagogue Stommeln, Stommeln, Germany
Promenade du Pin, Geneva, Switzerland
Gewerbeschule Bern (gibb - Berufsfachschule), Bern, Switzerland
Times Square, New York City, USA
The Dia Art Foundation, Beacon, New York, USA
CAPC, musée d'art contemporain de Bordeaux, Bordeaux, France
AOK Hessen – Beratungscenter Kassel-City, Kassel, Germany
Castello di Rivoli, Torino, Italy
Kunsthaus Graz, Graz, Austria

Personal life
Neuhaus was married with Silvia Cecere in 1996. Together they had a daughter named Claudia. Neuhaus died of cancer in his home of Maratea, Italy on February 3, 2009.

References

Further reading

Cooke, Lynne, Karen Kelly and Barbara Schröder, eds. (2009). Max Neuhaus: Times Square, Time Piece Beacon. Dia Art Foundation.

Eppley, Charles (May 2017). Soundsites: Max Neuhaus, Site-Specificity, and the Materiality of Sound as Place. Dissertation. Stony Brook University. 
Eppley, Charles (December 2017). "Times Square: Strategies and Contingencies of Preserving Sonic Art," Leonardo Music Journal. 

Murph, Megan (2013), Max Neuhaus and the Musical Avant-Garde. Thesis. Louisiana State University. 
Murph, Megan (2018). Max Neuhaus, R. Murray Schafer, and the Challenges of Noise. Dissertation. University of Kentucky.

External links
 https://www.max-neuhaus.estate
Max Neuhaus papers, 1950s-1980 (Columbia University, Archival Collections: Rare Book and Manuscript Library) 
Max Neuhaus Website (Archive from June 26, 2018; accessed February 1, 2019)
Auracle
Dia Art Foundation: Times Square
Dia Art Foundation: Time Piece Beacon
Kunsthaus Graz: Time Piece Graz
Max Neuhaus Papers at the Rare Book and Manuscript Library, Columbia University, New York, NY

1939 births
2009 deaths
American installation artists
Experimental composers
American sound artists
Male classical composers
20th-century American composers
20th-century American male musicians